Passiflora coccinea (common names scarlet passion flower, red passion flower) is a fast-growing vine. The vine is native to northern South America. It produces edible fruit.

Most plants cultivated as Passiflora coccinea turn out to be Passiflora miniata Vanderpl.

References

 Species reference in Tropicos.org

External links
 
 

coccinea